Atlanta Artists was a sub-label of Mercury Records founded by Larry Blackmon of the group Cameo.

Origins
After Cameo's 7th album, Knights of the Sound Table (1981), Blackmon reduced the group from ten members to a five-member unit.  This change was made due to the economics of the music industry at that time.  Blackmon relocated the group from New York to Atlanta, Georgia.

With their core of five members, they released the album Alligator Woman, a fusion of funk, new wave and a synthesizer-driven sound (compared to their previous albums which had more horn arrangements).

Atlanta Artists history
The album Style followed in 1983 as the first release for Atlanta Artists.  This release continued their new musical direction by adding electronic drums to their production.  This new sound was a blueprint for their following albums.

The funk group Ca$hflow and solo artist Barbara Mitchell (formerly in the female group High Inergy) signed and released for the label, while Blackmon produced also artists on other labels:

 Tomi Jenkins - 1989 / Elektra
 Bobby Brown - 1986 / MCA
 The Reddings - 1985 / Polydor
 George Howard - 1990 / GRP

During Cameo's popular concert tours in the UK around the mid-1980s, Ca$hflow traveled along with them as a supporting act.

In 1991, after Cameo's move to Reprise, Atlanta Artists was absorbed into Mercury Records.

References

Contemporary R&B record labels
Soul music record labels
American record labels
Record labels established in 1982
1982 establishments in the United States